Courtney Eaton (born 6 January 1996) is an Australian actress. She is known for her supporting roles as Ava in the 2019 film Line of Duty, Cheedo the Fragile in the 2015 film Mad Max: Fury Road, and as Zaya in the 2016 film Gods of Egypt.

Early life 
Eaton was born on 6 January 1996 in Bunbury, Western Australia. Her father, Stephen Eaton, is of English descent, and her mother is of Chinese, Cook Island and Māori descent. She has a younger brother.

Eaton studied at Bunbury Cathedral Grammar School.

Career 
Eaton was spotted by Christine Fox, head of Vivien's Models, in a fashion graduation at age eleven. Fox signed up Eaton and prepared her to model at age sixteen. Eaton took part in an acting workshop with Myles Pollard as part of her modelling development, and auditioned in Sydney for Mad Max: Fury Road (2015). She landed a part and co-starred in the series as Cheedo the Fragile, one of the five wives of Immortan Joe in the film. Of her part, Eaton said that Fragile is "the youngest of the [five] wives."

In December 2013, Eaton was cast in the fantasy action film Gods of Egypt (2016), as Zaya, a slave girl and love interest of one of the main characters (Brenton Thwaites), appearing alongside Gerard Butler and Nikolaj Coster-Waldau, under Alex Proyas' direction.

In May 2016, it was announced that Eaton would be starring alongside Ross Lynch in the fantasy-comedy film Status Update. She starred alongside Aaron Eckhart in the action thriller Line of Duty which was released in 2019. In December 2019, Eaton was cast in a recurring role as Lottie in the TV series Yellowjackets. She had originally auditioned for the role of Shauna. For the upcoming second season of the show, Eaton has been made a series regular.

Personal life 
Eaton lives in Los Angeles. She dated Ross Lynch from 2015 to 2017. As of 2019, she is dating Spencer Goodall.

Filmography

References

External links 

 

1996 births
Living people
21st-century Australian actresses
Actresses from Western Australia
Australian actresses of Chinese descent
Australian child models
Australian expatriate actresses in the United States
Australian film actresses
Australian models of Chinese descent
Australian people of Cook Island descent
Australian people of English descent
Australian people of Māori descent
Australian television actresses
Female models from Western Australia
People from Bunbury, Western Australia